The Miles Hawk Trainer was a 1930s British two-seat training monoplane designed by Miles Aircraft Limited.

Design and development
The Miles Hawk Trainer was developed from the Hawk Major to meet a requirement to supplement the de Havilland Tiger Moth in the training role. The aircraft had dual controls, blind flying equipment and vacuum operated flaps.

Based on the attributes of the Trainer, the Air Ministry issued Specification T.40/36, which led directly to the Miles Magister.

Variants
M.2W Hawk Trainer
Initial production version powered by a de Havilland Gipsy Major engine, four built.
M.2X Hawk Trainer
Improved version with a larger horn-balanced rudder, nine built.
M.2Y Hawk Trainer
M.2X with minor changes, 13 built.
Note that Hawk Trainer Mk II and Mk III were variants of the Miles Magister.

Operators

Royal Romanian Air Force

Royal Air Force

Spanish Republican Air Force

Survivors
M.2W registered G-ADWT is still flyable and based in England

Specifications (M.2W)

See also

References

 Amos, Peter. and Brown, Don Lambert. Miles Aircraft Since 1925, Volume 1. London: Putnam Aeronautical, 2000. .  
 Brown, Don Lambert. Miles Aircraft Since 1925. London: Putnam & Company Ltd., 1970. . 

 

1930s British military trainer aircraft
Hawk Trainer
Single-engined tractor aircraft
Aircraft first flown in 1935